The 74th Golden Globe Awards, honoring the best in film and American television of 2016, was broadcast live on January 8, 2017 from The Beverly Hilton in Beverly Hills, California beginning at 5:00 p.m. PST / 8:00 p.m. EST by NBC. The ceremony was produced by Dick Clark Productions in association with the Hollywood Foreign Press Association.

Talk-show host Jimmy Fallon was announced as the host of the ceremony on August 2, 2016. Meryl Streep was announced as the Cecil B. DeMille Lifetime Achievement Award honoree on November 3, 2016. The nominations were announced on December 12, 2016, by Don Cheadle, Laura Dern and Anna Kendrick.

La La Land won all seven awards for which it had been nominated, becoming the most successful film in Golden Globe Awards history. including Best Director and Best Screenplay for Damien Chazelle, and Best Motion Picture – Musical or Comedy. The only other film to win more than one award was Elle, which won both the awards for which it had been nominated. Atlanta, The Crown, The Night Manager, and The People v. O. J. Simpson: American Crime Story were among the television shows that received multiple awards.

Winners and nominees 
The nominees for the 74th Golden Globe Awards were announced on December 12, 2016.

Film

Films with multiple nominations
The following 17 films received multiple nominations:

Films with multiple wins
The following 2 films received multiple wins:

Television

Series with multiple nominations
The following 16 series received multiple nominations:

Series with multiple wins
The following 4 series received multiple wins:

Ceremony

Jimmy Fallon opened the ceremony with a long homage to La La Land, with cameos from Nicole Kidman, Amy Adams, Ryan Reynolds, Tina Fey, Justin Timberlake, and others. His opening speech was marred by a brief delay after his teleprompter broke.

Meryl Streep, recipient of the Golden Globe Cecil B. DeMille Award, used her acceptance speech to criticize, without stating names, President-elect Donald Trump's alleged imitation of disabled New York Times journalist Serge F. Kovaleski, stating: "Disrespect invites disrespect. Violence incites violence. When powerful people use their position to bully we all lose." On the subject of diversity in Hollywood, Streep said, "Hollywood is crawling with outsiders and foreigners, and if we kick them all out, you'll have nothing to watch but football and mixed martial arts, which are not the arts."

 Ben Affleck, Sienna Miller and Zoe Saldana with Best Director – Motion Picture
 Casey Affleck introduced Manchester by the Sea
 Drew Barrymore and Timothy Olyphant with Best Television Series – Comedy or Musical and Best Actress in a Television Series – Comedy or Musical
 Kristen Bell and Cuba Gooding Jr. with Best Supporting Actress – Series, Miniseries or Television Film
 Annette Bening introduced 20th Century Women
 Matt Bomer and Naomi Campbell with Best Supporting Actor – Series, Miniseries or Television Film
 Pierce Brosnan introduced Sing Street
 Steve Carell and Kristen Wiig with Best Animated Feature Film
 Jessica Chastain and Eddie Redmayne with Best Motion Picture – Musical or Comedy
 Priyanka Chopra and Jeffrey Dean Morgan with Best Actor in a Television Series – Drama
 Matt Damon with Best Actress in a Motion Picture – Musical or Comedy
 Viola Davis with Cecil B. DeMille Award
 Laura Dern and Jon Hamm with Best Television Series – Drama and Best Actress in a Television Series – Drama
 Leonardo DiCaprio with Best Actress in a Motion Picture – Drama
 Gal Gadot and Chris Hemsworth with Best Foreign Language Film
 Hugh Grant introduced Florence Foster Jenkins
 Jake Gyllenhaal introduced Deadpool
 Goldie Hawn and Amy Schumer with Best Actor in a Motion Picture – Musical or Comedy
 Felicity Jones and Diego Luna with Best Screenplay
 Michael Keaton with Best Supporting Actress – Motion Picture
 Anna Kendrick and Justin Theroux with Best Actor – Miniseries or Television Film
 Nicole Kidman and Reese Witherspoon with Best Miniseries or Television Film and Best Actress – Miniseries or Television Film
 Brie Larson with Best Actor in a Motion Picture – Drama
 John Legend introduced La La Land
 Mandy Moore and Milo Ventimiglia with Best Actor in a Television Series – Comedy or Musical
 Dev Patel and Sunny Pawar introduced Lion
 Chris Pine introduced Hell or High Water
 Brad Pitt introduced Moonlight
 Ryan Reynolds and Emma Stone with Best Supporting Actor – Motion Picture
 Sylvester Stallone and Carl Weathers with Best Motion Picture – Drama
 Sting and Carrie Underwood with Best Original Score and Best Original Song
 Vince Vaughn introduced Hacksaw Ridge
 Sofía Vergara with intro of Miss Golden Globe

Reception
Press coverage of the event largely focused on Meryl Streep's remarks and the responses to them, and this also dominated popular responses, generating what the BBC characterized as a "firestorm on Twitter". Donald Trump responded to Streep's comments on Twitter, describing her as "one of the most over-rated actresses in Hollywood" and a "Hillary flunky", and stating, "For the 100th time, I never 'mocked' a disabled reporter (would never do that) but simply showed him 'groveling' when he totally changed a 16 year old story that he had written in order to make me look bad. Just more very dishonest media!"

Lorenzo Soria, president of the Hollywood Foreign Press Association (HFPA) which runs the annual Golden Globes ceremony, wrote on Twitter on January 10: "As an organisation of journalists, the HFPA stands by your defence of free expression and we reject any calls for censorship". Dana White, president of the Ultimate Fighting Championship, responded to Streep's reference to mixed martial arts (MMA), defending the sport as an art, and saying that "the last thing I expect is for an uppity 80-year-old lady to be in our demographic and love mixed martial arts". Scott Coker, president of Bellator MMA, also defended MMA as an art, and highlighted the sport's diversity; he invited Streep to attend an event.

Tom Hiddleston received backlash on social media for mentioning that Sudanese medical workers had "binge-watched" The Night Manager, while accepting the award for Best Actor – Miniseries or Television Film. He apologized after the ceremony for his "inelegantly expressed" remarks.

Richard Lawson, reviewing the ceremony in Vanity Fair, stated that Jimmy Fallon's opening homage to La La Land began as "a fun, starry sampling of this year's nominees", but had "worn out its welcome" before the end. Lawson described Fallon as an "oddly tone-deaf" host, and criticized his opening speech: "The jokes were stale and wheezy and Fallon's lovable-cute shtick was more wearying than it was charming." He praised Kristen Wiig and Steve Carell's introduction of the Best Animated Feature Film award as "hilarious [...] weird, inspired, clever without smirking".

The Guardians film critic Peter Bradshaw expressed disappointment that La La Lands success "shut out a lot of contenders that are now in danger of being forgotten and losing momentum", particularly highlighting Nocturnal Animals and Moonlight. He praised Isabelle Huppert's win for Best Actress in a Motion Picture – Drama, calling it "the most extraordinary award".

Ratings
The ceremony averaged a Nielsen 5.6 ratings/18 share, and was watched by 20.02 million viewers. The ratings was an eight percent increase from the previous year's ceremony's viewership of 18.5 million, becoming the third highest in a decade.

In Memoriam
No "In Memoriam" section was broadcast on television during the ceremony. The HFPA included a slideshow on their website including the following names:

 Pat Harrington Jr.
 David Bowie
 Alan Rickman
 George Kennedy
 Larry Drake
 Ken Howard
 Garry Shandling
 Earl Hamner Jr.
 Patty Duke
 Ronit Elkabetz
 Prince
 Muhammad Ali
 Christina Grimmie
 Theresa Saldana
 Peter Shaffer
 Anton Yelchin
 Michael Cimino
 Abbas Kiarostami
 Hector Babenco
 Garry Marshall
 Fyvush Finkel
 Arthur Hiller
 Gene Wilder
 Hugh O'Brian
 Curtis Hanson
 Robert Vaughn
 Alan Thicke
 Zsa Zsa Gabor
 George Michael
 Carrie Fisher
 Debbie Reynolds

See also
 22nd Critics' Choice Awards
 23rd Screen Actors Guild Awards
 37th Golden Raspberry Awards
 70th British Academy Film Awards
 89th Academy Awards

Notes

References

External links

 
 
 

074
2016 awards
2016 awards in the United States
2016 film awards
2016 television awards
January 2017 events in the United States